Odisha Coal and Power Limited (OCPL) is a coal mining company owned by Government of Odisha. It was incorporated under the Companies Act 2013 on 20 January 2016. It has been allocated with two coal blocks in the state of Odisha by the Ministry of Coal, Government of India namely Manoharpur and Dipside of Manoharpur coal blocks in Sundergarh District of Odisha.

OCPL was started as a Joint venture company of Odisha Power Generation Corporation Limited and Odisha Hydro Power Corporation Limited, with 51% and 49% partnership respectively.

However, in February, 2023 the shares of OHPC was taken over by Government of Odisha.

The shareholding pattern of OCPL is as follows

Project
The OCPL has been allotted two coal blocks namely Manoharpur and Dipside of Manoharpur coal mines. The Manoharpur coal mine operation has commenced and the coal production from this mine has started in October-2019. OCPL has engaged M/s BGR Mining Ltd. as the Mine Operator for the Manoharpur coal mine project. During financial 2019–20, around 1.05 million tonnes of coal have been produced. Further OCPL has engaged M/s McNally Bharat Engineering Co. Ltd. as its contractor for the construction of a Coal Handling Plant (CHP) of 4,000 TPH capacity at the pit head of the Manoharpur coal mine. The construction of the CHP is in progress.

References

External links
 

Coal companies of India
Companies based in Bhubaneswar
Indian companies established in 2015
Energy in Odisha
State agencies of Odisha
2015 establishments in Odisha